Butere is a town in Kakamega County of the former Western Province of Kenya. It has an urban population of 4,725 (2009 census). Until 2010, the town was the capital of the former Butere/Mumias District.

Transportation links
Butere is linked by road to Mumias in the north and Kisumu in the southeast. A branch railway line from Kisumu ends at Butere. Passenger service on the branch line was resumed in January 2007 after a lengthy suspension.

The name Butere comes from one of the main clans in the division the Abatere subclan who reside in areas such as Muyundi, Masaba, and around the township. Abate were the predominant inhabitants of Butere until Europeans selected the area as  base for their administrative tasks.

Economy
Quite similar to its neighboring sub-counties; for many years, the economy of Butere was heavily dependent on the cultivation of sugar cane. However, based on the fact that the sugar industry proved to be unfeasible for many farmers, they have removed sugar cane from their farms and has resorted to cultivating maize. There are also certain residents who depend on small-scale cattle-rearing, apiculture and aquaculture for their livelihood.

Traditionally; the people of Butere have been small-scale farmers planting sorghum, millet, and assorted vegetables alongside fishing in Lake Victoria, trading these produce with their neighbors from the south in Nyanza.

The introduction of maize eventually changed the main staple food from ugali made from sorghum to maize meal.

Residents of this area strongly believe that since most residents of Butere have relied on sugarcane cultivation as a source of income alongside other farming activities; since Mumias's sugar company has collapsed, it would be most ideal for political leaders to seek an alternative industry to serve the need of this economy as the sugar industry may be too difficult to resuscitate.

Boda boda
Following the increase in unemployment in the sub-county, many youths have engaged in the motorbike business (commonly known as boda boda). This business earns them an average of Ksh500 a day.

Self-help groups
In the recent past, there has been an upsurge of self-help groups such as One-acre farm thanks to the foresight of community development leaders and well-wishers such as the Late Eshimuli, Late Prof. George Eshiwani, and Miriam Andai, and now Hon. Wycliffe Ambetsa Oparanya, Prof. Ruth Oniang'o, Hon. Andrew Toboso, and Fred Omukubi Otswong'o (of Shatieta Self-Help Group), authored a captivating article on the use of intellectual property rights regimes to protect traditional knowledge of local communities among others.

Inhabitants
The district is inhabited by 17 subtribes, amongst them Abakolwe, Abashitsetse, Abamukhula, Abatere, Abashirotsa, Abashiahaka, Abamwende, Abashibanga, Abashisa, Aberecheya, and Abachenya. The Marama have been very close to the Wanga and the Wanga king Nabongo Mumia was a son to a Marama woman.

Prominent residents 
Moody Awori former vice president, born in Butere.
Martin Shikuku politician.
Hon. Tindi Mwale current MP, politician, Community mobilizer, and Entrepreneur.
Hon. Professor Amukowa Anangwe Former member of Parliament, Butere constituency, currently living in and working in Tanzania as a lecturer at the famous university of Dar es Salaam.
Benson Milimo Lecturer,  Moi University, School of Nursing and midwifery (Currently Chair of Department of Midwifery and gender)
 Eng. Alfred Chitui Ashiembi community philanthropist who supports children education most especially the girl child and orphans.

Politics 
The politics of Butere have been dominated by clan rivalries. Martin Shikuku represented from independence until 1997 with short breaks. Shikuku first lost the seat in the mid-1970s when he was detained by the Jomo Kenyatta government for saying the then ruling Party Kanu was dead. Upon his release when Moi took over in 1978, he recaptured the seat in 1979 by-elections. He however lost it again to Jesse Eshikhati Opembe in the 1988 mlolongo elections. Open however died only six months after the election paving the way for Moses Okwara who won the ensuing by-election. Shiku returned to recapture the seat in the 1992 multiparty elections on the Kenneth Matiba led  FORD-Asili party and represented the constituency for one term until 2007 when former University of Nairobi Lecturer, Dr. Amukowa Anangwe defeated him in 1997 general elections in which Shikuku also ran for the presidency. Anangwe was however in 2002 ousted by flamboyant Wycliffe Oparanya whose popularity was boosted by his youth soccer program in the division. The Late Mr. Naaman Otswong'o Chirande, a Shrewd Businessman and the area Councilor between 1969 and 1974 brought a lot of development to lower Butere Market including the main market, especially selling of cattle on every Monday at the Market. His son Fred Omukubi Otswong'o intends to step in his shoes as the next area MP.

The 2007 elections were won by Wycliffe Oparanya as the constituency seemed to abandon Musikari Kombo's Ford Kenya in favor of the Orange Democratic Movement (ODM) now led by Prime Minister and Langata MP Raila Odinga. This was evidenced by an apparent rush by most politicians to troop to the party among them former Minister Dr. Amukowa Anangwe, Businessman Justus Anyanga Wanekeya, and Arch. Mohammed Munyanya.

The formation of the United Democratic Forum Party (UDFP) arising from the systematic breakaway of the Pentagon into a rival party will have a major impact on the forthcoming elections on 4 March 2013. In recent by-elections, UDF managed to show its national strength by emerging second in Kangema Constituency.

In Bukura civic ward in Butere, the hitherto dominance of coalition partner ODM was shown to have given in to emerging UDF forces as UDF garnered close to half the votes showing a similar drop in the incumbent coalition partner.

Butere electorate comprises highly educated individuals and has vowed to consider the individual's performance and character. The usual political wave appears to be blowing in favor of the new UDF party whose Presidential candidate is the Deputy Prime Minister Hon. Wycliffe Musalia Mudavadi. He was recently received by a huge crowd at Sabatia trading Centre which shares a name with his Constituency.

Religion
The division is predominantly Anglican though other denominations claim a significant percentage of followers. The outgoing Bishop of Butere ACK diocese, Horace Etemesi successfully used the ACK influence to plant Dr. Anangwe as area MP in 1997 over Martin Shikuku a Catholic but his influence was insignificant in the wake of the 2002 NARC wave. The Late Naaman Otswong'o and Philip Ingutia used the Church to gain mileage in business and farming respectively. Today, the most prominent sons of Butere continue to contribute to the Church's development including the scholars like Fred Omukubi Otswong'o of JKUAT.

Academic institutions 
The Sub-county has one National and one Provincial secondary school(s):- Butere Girls' High School, which is the National school, and Butere Boys' High School, which is the Provincial school. The district also has numerous day secondary schools with Lunza Secondary School being the largest in terms of the student population and perennial good performance. Others are Bukolwe, Shiatsala, Shikunga and Bumamu Secondary School.

The introduction of the Constituency Development Fund saw Buchenya Girls' School being chosen as a center of academic excellence due to its central location. Shibembe Secondary, Mukoye girls, and Mabole Boys have also been recently established.

There are several primary schools in the district with Butere Primary School, Buchenya Primary, and Shirembe Primary School being the more famous.

There are small kindergartens in the sub-county including a self-help group driven by Shatieta Nursery School right fronted by one Fred Omukubi, which require support and assistance in order to guarantee sustained future scholars.

References

Kakamega County
Populated places in Western Province (Kenya)